Claudiu Andrei Keșerü (born 2 December 1986) is a Romanian professional footballer who plays mainly as a striker for Liga I club UTA Arad.

After starting out at hometown side FC Oradea, he soon moved to Nantes in 2003. Over the course of nearly eleven years in France, Keșerü represented five teams and amassed Ligue 1 and Ligue 2 totals of 240 appearances and 67 goals. In 2014, he returned to his native country by signing a contract with defending champions FCSB. Keșerü also had a brief spell with Al-Gharafa in Qatar, before moving to Ludogorets Razgrad in the summer of 2015, where he netted more than 110 times in the Bulgarian First League. He became the foreign player with the most goals in the latter competition, and is also the only foreigner to become season top scorer more than once.

Keșerü made his first senior international appearance for Romania in October 2013, in a 4–0 defeat of Andorra. He has since earned over 40 caps and was included in the squad that participated at the UEFA Euro 2016.

Club career

Bihor Oradea
A youth product of Bihor Oradea, Keșerü was discovered and trained by Alexandru Gergely, former player in the 1970s golden team of FC Bihor. After its promotion in the senior squad, he played a season in the second division for his hometown club and scored 2 goals in 13 matches, as "the Red and Blues" earned promotion to the Liga I. His first match in the latter competition was on 23 August 2003, a goalless draw with Petrolul Ploiești.

Nantes
In 2003, he was brought to France by Nantes. Initially included in the second team, he was promoted after a season and made his Ligue 1 debut. He played for Nantes for four years, scoring 11 goals in 81 matches. He was relegated with the club to Ligue 2 in 2007 and promoted a year later.

In 2008, Keșerü was loaned by Nantes to the Ligue 2 side Libourne. Mainly a substitute, he scored 11 goals in 17 matches. The following season, he was loaned to another second division side, Tours, where he netted 7 times in 12 matches.

Angers

In 2010, Keșerü was loaned by Nantes to Angers. In his first season spent there, he scored 4 goals in 14 matches, and was bought from Nantes after the end of loan period. He spent three years with Angers, imposing himself as a regular starter.

Bastia
Despite interest from FCSB and Olympiacos Piraeus, Keșerü remained in France, where he signed with Bastia. On 31 August 2013, he scored his first goal for Bastia in a 2–1 win over Toulouse. He played 16 matches in Ligue 1, but failed to impress, and left the club in the winter of 2014.

FCSB
In January 2014, Keșerü joined defending Romanian champions FCSB, with whom he won the league title and played the final of the Romanian Cup. His first goal in a European competition came in the 2–2 draw against Aktobe in UEFA Champions League's third qualifying round.

Keșerü broke the club record for goals in a single game, scoring all six goals in a 6–0 win against Pandurii Târgu Jiu on 15 August 2014. The record was previously held by his coach, Constantin Gâlcă, who scored five times in a 5–0 victory over FC Brașov in 1994. It was the first time that a player scored six goals in a Liga I game since 9 June 1993, when Marian Popa of Farul Constanța accomplished the feat in a 6–3 success against Oțelul Galați. On 18 September 2014, in the first matchday of the Europa League group stage, a 6–0 win over Aalborg, Keșerü netted a hat-trick in just 12 minutes, between the 61st and 72nd minutes, resulting in the fastest hat-trick in the competition's history.

Al-Gharafa
In February 2015, Keșerü signed with Qatari side Al-Gharafa on a two-and-a-half-year deal.

Ludogorets Razgrad
Keșerü then signed a three-year contract in August 2015 with Bulgarian club Ludogorets Razgrad worth €700,000 per annum, becoming the highest-paid player ever for The Eagles. In his first season, the team won the championship, and Keșerü became its top striker with 15 goals.

Keșerü scored an equalizer against Red Star Belgrade in the first leg of third qualifying round of the 2016–17 UEFA Champions League, and then another equalizer in the second leg away match against Viktoria Plzeň in the play-off, helping his team to qualify for the group stage. He scored his maiden goal in the Champions League groups to give a 2–0 lead in the home match against English club Arsenal, but Ludogorets eventually lost by 2–3. On 28 October 2016, Keșerü scored his first hat-trick for Ludogorets in a league match against Dunav Ruse, a feat that he repeated later in the season against Lokomotiv Gorna Oryahovitsa. Eventually, with 22 goals, Keșerü became top goalscorer of the 2016–17 Bulgarian championship and won back-to-back titles with Ludogorets.

Keșerü went on to score two goals in the second leg home match against FK Žalgiris in the second qualifying round of the 2017–18 UEFA Champions League which Ludogorets won 5–3 on aggregate. Keșerü won the Bulgarian championship for a third time in the 2017–18 season, also becoming top goalscorer of the league with 26 goals. He also scored the winning goal in the 2018 Bulgarian Supercup final. On 7 October 2018, he contributed three goals in a 4–1 away win over Botev Vratsa, thus becoming the foreigner with the most hat-tricks in the A PFG, having managed the feat on five separate occasions. On 19 September 2019, Keșerü scored three goals in the 5:1 home win against CSKA Moscow in a UEFA Europa League group stage match. In May 2020, Keșerü extended his contract with the team for two more years. Prior to the 2021-22 season Keșerü lost his status as a first team regular, not being included among the squad members for Ludogorets' second qualifying round match in the Champions League. He left the team in late August 2021.

Return to FCSB
After Keșerü terminated his contract with Ludogorets Razgrad, he came back to FCSB on 31 August 2021 for his second time. On 12 September, he scored for FCSB in Romanian's Liga I against FC Dinamo Bucuresti in the eternal derby. FCSB won that match with 6-0. After having a conflict with club's owner, George Becali, ordered the coach to keep Keșerü out of the team, till his contract will expire. He left the club on 30 May.

UTA Arad
After leaving FCSB, Keșerü signed a 2 year contract with Liga I side UTA Arad.

International career

On 11 October 2013, Keșerü made his full debut for Romania in a 4–0 win against Andorra, scoring the first goal of the match.

He was selected in Romania's squad for UEFA Euro 2016, playing the full 90 minutes in the second group match against Switzerland. This was Keșerü's only appearance of the tournament, as his country finished bottom of the group.

In 2019, he scored 5 goals in 3 games for Romania vs Sweden, Faroe islands and Norway.

Personal life
Keșerü is of partial Hungarian descent but doesn't speak the language.

Keșerü has been married since 2012. On 22 December 2016, his spouse Laura Dorina gave birth to a son.

Career statistics

Club

International

Scores and results list Romania's goal tally first, score column indicates score after each Keșerü goal.

Honours
Nantes
Coupe de la Ligue runner-up: 2003–04

Steaua București
Liga I: 2013–14 , 2014–15
Cupa Romaniei: 2014–15
Cupa Ligii: 2014–15
Supercupa României runner-up: 2014

Ludogorets Razgrad
Bulgarian First League: 2015–16, 2016–17, 2017–18, 2018–19, 2019–20, 2020–21
Bulgarian Cup runner-up: 2017–18
Bulgarian Supercup: 2018, 2019

Individual
UNFP Ligue 2 Team of the Season: 2012–13 
Gazeta Sporturilor Romanian Footballer of the Year runner-up: 2014
Bulgarian First League top scorer: 2016–17 (22 goals), 2017–18 (26 goals), 2020–21 (18 goals)
Best foreign player in the Bulgarian First League: 2019

References

External links

 

1986 births
Living people
Sportspeople from Oradea
Romanian sportspeople of Hungarian descent
Romanian footballers
Association football forwards
Liga I players
Liga II players
FC Bihor Oradea players
Ligue 1 players
Ligue 2 players
FC Nantes players
FC Libourne players
Tours FC players
Angers SCO players
SC Bastia players
FC Steaua București players
FC UTA Arad players
Qatar Stars League players
Al-Gharafa SC players
First Professional Football League (Bulgaria) players
Second Professional Football League (Bulgaria) players
PFC Ludogorets Razgrad players
PFC Ludogorets Razgrad II players
Romania under-21 international footballers
Romania international footballers
UEFA Euro 2016 players
Romanian expatriate footballers
Expatriate footballers in France
Romanian expatriate sportspeople in France
Expatriate footballers in Qatar
Romanian expatriate sportspeople in Qatar
Expatriate footballers in Bulgaria
Romanian expatriate sportspeople in Bulgaria